The Republic of China (ROC; commonly called "Taiwan") competed at the 1960 Summer Olympics in Rome, Italy. 27 competitors, 24 men and 3 women, took part in 18 events in 6 sports. The nation won its first ever Olympic medal.  The ROC was forced to use the name "Formosa" (formerly the common Western name for the island). In the opening ceremony the athletes marched behind a sign reading "UNDER PROTEST".

Medalists

Silver
Yang Chuan-kwang — athletics, men's decathlon

Athletics

Boxing

Football

Shooting

Three shooters represented the Republic of China in 1960.

25 m pistol
 Chen An-hu

300 m rifle, three positions
 Wu Tao-yan

50 m rifle, three positions
 Wu Tao-yan

Trap
 Wang Ching-rui

Swimming

Weightlifting

Notes

References

Citations

Sources 

Official Olympic Reports
International Olympic Committee results database

Nations at the 1960 Summer Olympics
1960
1960 in Taiwanese sport